The 2020–21 season was Celtic's 132nd season of competitive football. They competed in the Scottish Premiership, League Cup, Scottish Cup, UEFA Champions League and UEFA Europa League. The club failed to win a trophy for first time since 2010.

Pre-season and friendlies
Celtic held a pre-season training camp in Loughborough (England), before continuing their preparations in France with friendlies against Nice, Lyon and Paris Saint-Germain. They rounded off pre-season with friendlies against Ross County and Hibernian at Celtic Park.

Scottish Premiership

The Scottish Premiership fixture list was announced on 6 July 2020. Celtic began their title defence against Hamilton Academical at Celtic Park.

Scottish League Cup

On 15 November, Celtic were drawn to face Ross County at Celtic Park in the second round of the 2020–21 Scottish League Cup.

Scottish Cup

On 23 March, it was determined that Celtic would face Falkirk at Celtic Park in the third round of the 2020–21 Scottish Cup. On 4 April, it was determined that Celtic would face Rangers at Ibrox Stadium in the fourth round.

UEFA Champions League

Celtic entered the Champions League at the first qualifying round. Due to the COVID-19 pandemic, all qualifiers were played as one-legged ties.

First qualifying round
On 9 August, Celtic were drawn to face KR Reykjavík (Iceland) in the first qualifying round of the UEFA Champions League.

Second qualifying round
On 19 August, it was determined that Celtic would face Ferencváros (Hungary) in the second qualifying round of the UEFA Champions League.

UEFA Europa League

Celtic entered the Europa League at the third qualifying round.

Third qualifying round
On 18 September, it was determined that Celtic would face Riga (Latvia) in the third qualifying round of the UEFA Europa League.

Play-off round
On 24 September, it was determined that Celtic would face Sarajevo (Bosnia and Herzegovina) in the play-off round of the UEFA Europa League.

Group stage
On 2 October, the draw for the 2020–21 UEFA Europa League group stage was made. Celtic were drawn in Group H along with Sparta Prague (Pot 2), Milan (Pot 3) and Lille (Pot 4).

Group H

Matches

Statistics
Note: Statistics for the delayed 2019–20 Scottish Cup semi-final played on 1 November 2020 and final played on 20 December 2020 are recorded under the 2019–20 Celtic F.C. season article.

Appearances and goals

|-
! colspan=16 style=background:#dcdcdc; text-align:center| Goalkeepers

|-
! colspan=16 style=background:#dcdcdc; text-align:center| Defenders

|-
! colspan=16 style=background:#dcdcdc; text-align:center| Midfielders

|-
! colspan=16 style=background:#dcdcdc; text-align:center| Forwards

|-
! colspan=16 style=background:#dcdcdc; text-align:center| Departures
|-

Notes

Goalscorers

Last updated: 15 May 2021

Disciplinary record
Includes all competitive matches. Players listed below made at least one appearance for Celtic first squad during the season.

Hat-tricks

(H) – Home; (A) – Away; (N) – Neutral

Clean sheets
As of 15 May 2021.

Attendances

Team statistics

League table

Competition overview

Results by round

Club

Technical staff

Kit
Supplier: Adidas / Sponsors: Dafabet (front) and Magners (back)

On 1 July 2020, Adidas replaced New Balance as the club's official kit supplier.

Home: The home kit features the club's traditional green and white hoops, with a yellow trim. White shorts and hooped white socks complete the look.
Away: The away kit features a mint green shirt, with a dark green trim. The shirt is accompanied by dark green shorts and hooped socks.
Third: The third kit features a midnight black shirt, with a mint green embroidered four-leaf clover. The shirt is accompanied by black shorts and socks.

Transfers

In

Out

See also
 List of Celtic F.C. seasons
Nine in a row

References

Celtic F.C. seasons
Celtic
Celtic
Celtic